B. Traven was a pseudonymous novelist (presumably German) whose most famous book was The Treasure of the Sierra Madre (1927), inspiring the 1948 film of the same name that won three Academy Awards. Over the years, several theories as to his true identity have been proposed.

Ret Marut 

The author of the first hypothesis concerning B. Traven's identity was the German journalist, writer and anarchist Erich Mühsam, who conjectured that a fellow German anarchist, the actor journalist, Ret Marut, was the same person as Traven.

The name "Ret Marut" was also a pseudonym. Marut gave various accounts of where and when he was born, but none of these could be proved by documentation. The name Ret Marut apparently first appeared in 1907, when he performed on stage in Idar (later Idar-Oberstein), followed by Ansbach, Suhl, Crimmitschau, Berlin, Danzig and Düsseldorf. From time to time, Marut also directed plays and wrote articles on theatre subjects.

Jan-Christoph Hauschild, in a 2018 biography of Traven, Das Phantom: Die fünf Leben des B. Traven, has carefully traced Ret Marut’s  career as an actor, director and political activist, using theatre, newspaper and other records, beginning at Idar in 1907.  Marut worked briefly in Ansbach, Franconia earning good reviews for his performances in the Fränkische Zeitung.  He was engaged as a comedy director and actor in Ohrdruf. He was then in Crimmitschau, Saxony, where he began a relationship with a fellow company member the twenty-two-year-old Elfriede Zielke.  Marut had to "report to the police at short intervals" in Crimmitschau  undoubtedly because of his lack of identity papers.  The couple joined a company which toured Pomerania, East and West Prussia, Poznan and Silesia. Between October 7, 1910 to April 9, 1911, Marut was on stage 156 times in forty-four productions and also directed twenty-seven productions. His next engagement was in Gdansk where on 20 March 1912 their daughter Irene was born.

Hauschild records that Marut began writing around this time. He was published in Berliner Tageblatt and the bourgeois liberal Frankfurter Zeitung. Some articles are reprinted in the Hamburger Fremdenblatt, the Neue Hamburger Zeitung, the Danziger Zeitung, the Berliner Morgenpost or the Zeit am Montag, an anarchist tabloid. Marut’s work also appeared in several Cologne daily newspapers, including the Kölner Tageblatt.  In May 1912 Marut had signed a three-year contract for the Schauspielhaus Düsseldorf as an actor for the coming season and two years later was appointed secretary of the Theater-Akademie there.
At this time Marut wrote two novels, which were not accepted by publishers, The Prince's Torch and The Man Named Site and the Green Glittering Woman. He spent the summer of 1914 at the Schauspielhaus in Munich which closed when the war broke out. He and Zielke separated at the end of 1914.

After a difficulty with police, Marut declared to German authorities that he was had been born in the United States and was a US citizen. (This would have made him exempt from military service in Germany, as the US was neutral at the time.) Marut applied twice for an American passport, claiming to have been born in San Francisco (probably knowing that all records for the city had been destroyed in the 1906 fire and earthquake). Both applications were refused.

In Dusseldorf, Marut began a new relationship with Irene Mermet, 22, who came to the theatre academy as a paying pupil in 1915. His articles began to appear in significant weekly  magazines, Reclams Universum and Westermann's Monthly.  In November 1915 Marut was due to report to the police in Frankfurt am Main but did not turn up. He and Irene move to Munich the most liberal city in the German Reich with an intensive cultural and intellectual life.  At the address Clemensstraße 84 Marut is registered as the owner of a magazine and newspaper publishing house, Irene Mermet as the owner of a publishing bookstore with the address Herzogstraße 45. He produced a novel,  under the name Richard Maurhut: "An das Fräulein von S.....". It is his only work published under this name, as it is also the only publication of the publisher I. Mermet.

In 1917, at the American Vice Consulate in Munich, Marut tried again for an American passport, claiming that both he and his father had been born in San Francisco, and he had lost papers establishing his identity while travelling round Europe. He was not believed. In mid-1917, Marut published the first issue of Der Ziegelbrenner ("The Brick-burner"), an anarchist magazine that advocated international understanding and friendship, and questioned the state and its institutions; and was expressly aimed at the "educated classes". (The last issue appeared in 1921.)

After the proclamation of the short-lived Bavarian Soviet Republic in Munich on April 6, 1919, Marut was made director of the press division and member of its propaganda committee. Despite its name, the republic was formed by anarchists; German communists referred to it as a Schein-Räterepublik "Fake Soviet Republic". (Communists led by Eugen Leviné, took over control of the republic after a week.)

Marut was arrested after the overthrow of the Bavarian Soviet Republic by the German Army and right-wing militants (Freikorps) on May 1, 1919. As he was being taken to a place of execution, he reportedly managed to escape. The German Reich issued a warrant for Ret Marut's arrest that same year.

In Munich, Erich Mühsam, one of the leaders of the anarchists, got to know Marut well. Later, when B. Traven's first novels appeared, Mühsam was struck by similarities in their style and content, to Marut's Der Ziegelbrenner articles. He came to the conclusion that they must have been written by the same person.

Rolf Recknagel, an East German literary scholar from Leipzig, also believed that Marut and Traven were the same person. In 1966, Recknagel published a biography of Traven in which he claimed that the books signed with the pen name B. Traven (including the post-war ones) had been written by Ret Marut. At present, this hypothesis is accepted by most "Travenologists".

After the fall of the Bavarian republic and Marut’s escape, he and Mermet were in Berlin then in Cologne in touch with the artist F. W. Seiwert (whose portrait of Marut hung later in the Mexico home of Traven and Rosa Elena Lujan). In the summer of 1923 Irene Mermet embarked from Copenhagen on the post steamer Oscar II to New York. Marut went to England and sailed from Liverpool on board the Megantic third class to Quebec, where the authorities refused entry and sent him back on the next ship.

On 19 August 1923, Marut arrived in London, He lived at 649 Commercial Road, in the East End, close to the docks and mixing in left wing circles.  Once again he applies for papers to reach the United States and this is when the name Feige fits into the Traven story.

Otto Feige theory 
The Ret Marut hypothesis did not explain how the former actor and anarchist reached Mexico; it did not provide any information about his early life either. In the late 1970s, two BBC journalists, Will Wyatt and Robert Robinson, decided to investigate this matter. The results of their research were published in a documentary broadcast by the BBC on December 19, 1978, and in Wyatt's book The Man who Was B. Traven (U.S. title The Secret of the Sierra Madre), which appeared in 1980. The journalists gained access to Ret Marut's files in the United States Department of State and the British Foreign and Commonwealth Office; from these they discovered that Marut attempted to travel from Europe, via Britain, to Canada in 1923, but was turned back from that country. He was finally arrested and imprisoned as a foreigner without a residence permit in Brixton Prison, London, on November 30, 1923.

Interrogated by the British police, Marut testified that his real name was Hermann Otto Albert Maximilian Feige and that he had been born in Schwiebus in Germany (modern-day Świebodzin in Poland) on February 23, 1882. Wyatt and Robinson did research in the Polish archives and confirmed the authenticity of these facts; both the date and place of birth, and the given names of Feige's parents, agreed with Marut's testimony. The British journalists discovered further that after his apprenticeship and National Service in the German army around 1904/1905 Otto Feige disappeared leaving no trace except for a photograph made by a studio in Magdeburg. Robinson showed photographs of Marut and Traven to a brother and a sister of Feige, and they appeared to recognise the person in the photos as their brother. In 2008 Jan-Christoph Hauschild did research in German archives and confirmed the authenticity of the family memories. After working as a mechanic in Magdeburg, Feige became (summer 1906) head of the metal workers' union in Gelsenkirchen. In September 1907 he left the city and turned into Ret Marut, actor, born in San Francisco. He started his career in Idar (today Idar-Oberstein).

Ret Marut was held in Brixton prison until February 15, 1924. After his release in the spring of 1924, he went to the US consulate in London and asked for confirmation of his American citizenship. He claimed that he had been born in San Francisco in 1882, signed on a ship when he was ten and had been travelling around the world since then, but now wanted to settle down and get his life in order. Incidentally, Marut had also applied for US citizenship earlier when he lived in Germany. He filed altogether three applications at that time, claiming that he had been born in San Francisco on February 25, 1882, to parents William Marut and Helena Marut née Ottarent. The consulate officials did not take this story seriously, especially as they also received the other version of Marut's biography from the London police, about his birth in Schwiebus, which he had presented during the interrogation. Birth records in San Francisco were destroyed in the 1906 earthquake and fire, and for several decades afterwards false claims of birth there were common. In the opinion of Wyatt and Robinson, the version presented by Marut to the police was true – B. Traven was born as Otto Feige in Schwiebus (modern-day Świebodzin) and only later changed his name to Ret Marut, his stage name Marut being the anagram of traum (dream in German).

The above dates of Marut's  incarceration in the UK are supported by Thames Police Court and Brixton Prison records as well as travel documents. On July 27, 1923, a 41-year-old US citizen named Ret Marut left Liverpool aboard the SS Megantic bound for Quebec and Montreal, Canada. The passenger list from Liverpool states that Marut's original point of departure was Copenhagen, Denmark, and lists question marks under his country of residence and country of citizenship. Upon disembarking in Canada, he declared his intent to travel to the United States via Canada, that he was born in the US, a US citizen, had 50 dollars in his possession, and listed his occupation as a farmer and his language as "American". On August 19, 1923, Ret/Rex/Rox Marut arrived back in Liverpool as a deportee from Canada, still aboard SS Megantic.

The hypothesis that B. Traven is identical with Ret Marut and Otto Feige is nowadays accepted by many scholars. Tapio Helen points out that the adoption of such a version of the writer's biography would be very difficult to reconcile with the many Americanisms in his works and the general spirit of American culture pervading them; these must be proof of at least a long life of the writer in the American environment which was not the case in Feige's or Marut's biography. But the question of Americanisms is simply explained. Donald Chankin, in his psychological study of Traven, Anonymity and Death, cites the evidence of Traven’s first American editor:
 "Since all of Traven's books first appeared in Germany, it seemed likely that they were written in German and then translated into English by someone else. The language problem, at least as far as The Death Ship, The Treasure of the Sierra Madre, and The Bridge in the Jungle are concerned, has now been resolved by Bernard Smith in an article in the New York Times Book Review. Smith, who edited these books for Knopf in the 1930s, says that he worked from English-language manuscripts supplied by Traven, but that these had to be heavily edited because they were filled with Germanic constructions. The manuscript of The Death Ship was “unpublishable, for it was the work of a man who was clearly ill at ease in English.” Smith thinks that Traven “translated his own German into English literally, embellishing it occasionally with what he took to be American colloquialisms. Every other sentence was German in construction. Smith then undertook the rewriting of the books, while seeking to retain the "special flavor - the frequent awkwardness, the occasional stiltedness, the wavering union of toughness and sentimentality." He carefully adds that "there was nothing 'creative' about the work I did. I neither added nor subtracted. I inserted no thought or feeling of my own." "(p.110-111).  
This evidence has surprisingly remained either unknown, overlooked or ignored by most Traven scholars when citing the supposed difficulty of Americanisms in his work. 

On the other hand, if Marut was not identical with Otto Feige, it is difficult to explain how he knew the details of his birth so well, including his mother's maiden name, and the similarity of the faces and the handwriting.

The Otto Feige hypothesis has been rejected by Karl S. Guthke, who believes that Marut's story about his birth in San Francisco was nearer the truth, even though Guthke agrees with the opinion that Marut fantasized in his autobiography to some extent.

Arrival in Mexico 
After his release from the London prison, Ret Marut traveled from Europe to Mexico. The circumstances of this journey are not clear either. According to Rosa Elena Luján, the widow of Hal Croves, who is identified with B. Traven by many scholars (see below), her husband signed on a "death ship" after his release from prison and sailed to Norway, from there on board another "death ship" to Africa and, finally, on board a Dutch ship, reached Tampico on the Gulf of Mexico in the summer of 1924. He allegedly used his experiences from these voyages later in the novel The Death Ship. These assertions are partly supported by documents. Marut's name is on the list of the crew members of the Norwegian ship Hegre, which sailed from London to the Canary Islands on April 19, 1924; the name is, however, crossed out, which could imply that Marut did not take part in the voyage in the end. 
He was certainly in Mexico in July 1924 when he rented land in the American agricultural settlement Columbus (today: Cuauhtémoc, town of Altamira), a cotton plantation. On April 24, 1925, Traven informed his editor that he had moved his residence to Tampico, though correspondence should still go via Columbus. Mermet visited him in Mexico but returned to the United States after a six week stay in May 1926.

In the spring of 1917, after the United States entered the First World War, Mexico became a haven for Americans fleeing universal military conscription. In 1918, Linn Able Eaton Gale (1892–1940) and his wife Magdalena E. Gale fled from New York to Mexico City. Gale soon was a founding member of one of the early Communist Parties of Mexico (PCM). The Gales published the first Mexican issue of their periodical Gale's Journal (August 1917 – March 1921), sometimes subtitled The Journal of Revolutionary Communism in October 1918. In 1918, the Mexican section of the anarcho-syndicalist trade union Industrial Workers of the World (IWW) was also established; members of the IWW were known as "Wobblies". This was certainly a favourable environment for an anarchist and fugitive from Europe. In December 1920 Gale had even published an article in his magazine inviting revolutionaries to come. Gale, the person and the name, could have been the source for the figure of Gerald Gale, the hero of many novels by B. Traven, including The Cotton Pickers (first published as Der Wobbly) and The Death Ship. But from Traven's preserved notes, it does not appear that he also had to work in difficult conditions as a day labourer on cotton plantations and in oil fields.

Tapio Helen points out, there is an enormous contrast between the experiences and life of Marut, an actor and bohemian in Munich, and Traven's novels and short stories, characterized by their solid knowledge of Mexican and Indian cultures, seafaring themes, the problems of itinerant workers, political agitators and social activists of all descriptions, and pervaded with Americanisms.
However, Traven was a hungry autodidact who liked to show off his knowledge and under the name Traven Torsvan, he attended the six-week summer courses at the National University in Mexico from early July to mid-August 1927, attending classes on Spanish, Spanish conversation, and phonetics, Latin American literature, Mexican contemporary history, archaeology and folklore (where he received the highest grade "excelente"). In 1928 he attended eight courses; doing best in political and social problems in Mexico.

A solution to this riddle was proposed by the Swiss researcher Max Schmid, who put forward the so-called Erlebnisträger ("experience carrier") hypothesis in a series of eight articles published in the Zurich daily Tages-Anzeiger at the end of 1963 and the beginning of 1964. According to this hypothesis (which was published by Schmid under the pseudonym Gerard Gale!), Marut arrived in Mexico from Europe around 1922/1923 and met an American tramp, someone similar to Gerard Gale, who wrote stories about his experiences. Marut obtained these manuscripts from him (probably by trickery), translated them into German, added some elements of his own anarchist views and sent them, pretending that they were his own, to the German publisher.

Wyatt points out that there is no need for Schmid's hypothesis which was only a supposition. Traven immersed himself in Mexican life and history and he was a novelist. He made things up. His life does not have to match exactly the material in his books.

Traven Torsvan theory 

Most researchers also identify B. Traven with the person named Berick Traven Torsvan who lived in Mexico from at least 1924. Torsvan rented a wooden house north of Tampico in 1924 where he often stayed and worked until 1931. Later, from 1930, he lived for 20 years in a house with a small restaurant on the outskirts of Acapulco from which he set off on his travels throughout Mexico. As early as 1926, Torsvan took part as a photographer in an archeological expedition to the state of Chiapas led by Enrique Juan Palacios; one of the few photographs which may depict B. Traven, wearing a pith helmet, was taken during that expedition. Torsvan also travelled to Chiapas as well as to other regions of Mexico later, probably gathering materials for his books. He showed a lively interest in Mexican culture and history, following summer courses on the Spanish, Nahuatl and Mayan languages, the history of Latin American literature and the history of Mexico at the National Autonomous University of Mexico (UNAM) in the years 1927 and 1928.

In 1930 Torsvan received a foreigner's identification card as the North American engineer Traven Torsvan (in many sources, there also appears another first name of his: Berick or Berwick). It is known that B. Traven himself always claimed to be American. In 1933, the writer sent the English manuscripts of his three novels – The Death Ship, The Treasure of the Sierra Madre and The Bridge in the Jungle – to the New York City publishing house Alfred A. Knopf for publication, claiming that these were the original versions of the novels and that the earlier published German versions were only translations of them. The Death Ship was published by Knopf in 1934; it was soon followed by further Traven books that appeared in the United States and the United Kingdom. However, comparison of the German and English versions of these books shows significant differences between them. The English texts are usually longer; in both versions there are also fragments which are missing in the other language. The problem is made even more complex by the fact that Traven's books published in English are full of Germanisms whereas those published in German full of Anglicisms.

B. Traven's works also enjoyed a soaring popularity in Mexico itself. One person who contributed to this was Esperanza López Mateos, the sister of Adolfo López Mateos, later the President of Mexico, who translated eight books by Traven into Spanish from 1941. In subsequent years she acted as his representative in contacts with publishers and as the real owner of his copyright which she later transferred to his brothers.

Filming of The Treasure of the Sierra Madre and Hal Croves theory 

The commercial success of the novel The Treasure of the Sierra Madre, published in English by Knopf in 1935, induced the Hollywood production company Warner Bros. to buy the film rights in 1941. John Huston was signed to direct, but the Japanese attack on Pearl Harbor caused an interruption in work until after the war.

In 1946, Huston arranged to meet B. Traven at the Bamer Hotel in Mexico City to discuss the details of the filming. However, instead of the writer, an unknown man turned up at the hotel and introduced himself as Hal Croves, a translator from Acapulco and San Antonio. Croves showed an alleged power of attorney from Traven, in which the writer authorized him to decide on everything in connection with the filming of the novel on his behalf. Croves was also present at the next meeting in Acapulco and later, as a technical advisor, on location during the shooting of the film in Mexico in 1947. At this point, the mysterious behaviour of the writer and his alleged agent made many of the crew members believe that Croves was Traven in disguise. When the film became a box office success and won three Academy Awards the public clamored for information about the author. This excitement was partly fuelled by Warner Bros. itself; American newspapers wrote at length about a mysterious author who took part incognito in the filming of the film based on his own book.

Many biographers of Traven repeat the thesis that the director John Huston was also convinced that Croves was Traven. However, Huston denied identifying Croves with Traven as early as 1948. Huston also brought the matter up in his autobiography, published in 1980, where he wrote that he had been considering first that Croves might be Traven, but after observing his behaviour he had come to the conclusion that this was not the case. According to Huston, "Croves gave an impression quite unlike the one I had formed of Traven from reading his scripts and correspondence." However, according to Huston, Croves played a double game during the shooting of The Treasure of the Sierra Madre. Asked by crew members if he was Traven, he always denied it, but he did so in such a way that the questioners came to the conclusion that he and Traven were indeed the same person.

The "exposure" and vanishing of Torsvan 

The media publicity that accompanied the premiere of The Treasure of the Sierra Madre and the aura of mystery surrounding the author of the literary original of the film (rumour had it that Life magazine offered a reward of $5,000 for finding the real B. Traven) induced a Mexican journalist named Luis Spota to try to find Hal Croves, who disappeared after the end of the shooting of the film in the summer of 1947. Thanks to information obtained from the Bank of Mexico, in July 1948, Spota found a man who lived under the name of Traven Torsvan near Acapulco. He formally ran an inn there; however, his shabby joint did not have many customers; Torsvan himself was a recluse, called El Gringo by his neighbours, which would confirm his American nationality. Investigating in official archives, Spota discovered that Torsvan had received a foreigner's identification card in Mexico in 1930 and a Mexican ID card in 1942; on both documents the date and place of birth was March 5, 1890, in Chicago. According to official records, Torsvan arrived in Mexico from the United States, crossing the border in Ciudad Juárez in 1914. Using partly dishonest methods (Spota bribed the postman who delivered letters to Torsvan), the journalist found out that Torsvan received royalties payable to B. Traven from Josef Wieder in Zurich; on his desk, he also found a book package from the American writer Upton Sinclair, which was addressed to B. Traven c/o Esperanza López Mateos. When Spota asked Torsvan directly whether he, Hal Croves and B. Traven are one and the same person, he denied this angrily; however, in the opinion of the journalist, Torsvan got confused in his explanations and finally admitted indirectly to being the writer.

Spota published the results of his investigations in a long article in the newspaper Mañana on August 7, 1948. In reply to this, Torsvan published a denial in the newspaper Hoy on August 14. He received Mexican citizenship on September 3, 1951. A man named Traves Torstvan flew from Mexico City to Paris on Air France on September 8, 1953, and returned to Mexico City from Paris on September 28 of the same year. On October 10, 1959, Traves Torsvan arrived in Houston, Texas, from Mexico on a KLM airlines flight accompanied by his wife Rosa E. Torsvan, presumably Rosa Elena Luján. Torsvan states his citizenship as Mexican and his date and place of birth as May 2, 1890 (May 3 in the typewritten version of the document) in Chicago, Illinois. Rose E. Torstvan states her date of birth as April 6, 1915, in Proginoso [sic], Yucatan. These documents are evidence that Traven/Torsvan/Croves are one and the same person, and that rather than "disappearing", Torsvan took on his mother's supposed maiden name of Croves sometime after 1959.

B. Traven's agents and BT-Mitteilungen 
Esperanza López Mateos had been cooperating with B. Traven since at least 1941 when she translated his first novel The Bridge in the Jungle into Spanish. Later she also translated seven other novels of his. Esperanza, the sister of Adolfo López Mateos, later the President of Mexico, played an increasingly important role in Traven's life. For example, in 1947, she went to Europe to represent him in contacts with his publishers; finally, in 1948, her name (along with Josef Wieder from Zurich) appeared as the copyright holder of his books. Wieder, as an employee of the Büchergilde Gutenberg book club, had already been cooperating with the writer since 1933. In that year, the Berlin-based book club Büchergilde Gutenberg, which had been publishing Traven's books so far, was closed by the Nazis after Adolf Hitler took power. Traven's books were forbidden in Nazi Germany between 1933 and 1945, and the author transferred the publication rights to the branch of Büchergilde in Zurich, Switzerland, where the publishers also emigrated. In 1939, the author decided to end his cooperation with Büchergilde Gutenberg; after this break, his representative became Josef Wieder, a former employee of the book club who had never met the writer personally. Esperanza López Mateos died, committing suicide, in 1951; her successor was Rosa Elena Luján, Hal Croves' future wife.

In January 1951, Josef Wieder and Esperanza López Mateos, and after her death, Rosa Elena Luján, started publishing hectographically the periodical BT-Mitteilungen (BT-Bulletins), which promoted Traven's books and appeared until Wieder's death in 1960. According to Tapio Helen, the periodical used partly vulgar methods, often publishing obvious falsehoods, for example about the reward offered by Life magazine when it was already known that the reward was only a marketing trick. In June 1952, BT-Mitteilungen published Traven's "genuine" biography, in which it claimed that the writer had been born in the Midwestern United States to an immigrant family from Scandinavia, that he had never gone to school, had had to make his living from the age of seven and had come to Mexico as a ship boy on board a Dutch steamer when he was ten. The editors also repeated the thesis that B. Traven's books were originally written in English and only later translated into German by a Swiss translator.

Return of Hal Croves 
In the meantime, Hal Croves, who had disappeared after shooting the film The Treasure of the Sierra Madre, appeared on the literary scene in Acapulco again. He acted as a writer and the alleged representative of B. Traven, on behalf of whom he negotiated the publication and filming of his books with publishers and film producers. Rosa Elena Luján became Croves' secretary in 1952, and they married in San Antonio, Texas, on May 16, 1957. After the wedding, they moved to Mexico City, where they ran the Literary Agency R.E. Luján. Following Josef Wieder's death in 1960, Rosa was the only copyright holder for Traven's books.

In October 1959, Hal Croves and Rosa Elena Luján visited Germany to take part in the premiere of the film The Death Ship based on Traven's novel. During the visit reporters tried to induce Croves to admit to being Traven, but in vain. Such attempts ended without success also in the 1960s. Many journalists tried to get to Croves' home in Mexico City; but only very few were admitted to him by Rosa, who guarded the privacy of her already very aged, half blind and half deaf husband. The articles and interviews with Croves always had to be authorized by his wife. Asked by journalists if he was Traven, Croves always denied or answered evasively, repeating Traven's sentence from the 1920s that the work and not the man should count.

Hal Croves' death 
Hal Croves died in Mexico City on March 26, 1969. On the same day, his wife announced at a press conference that her husband's real name was Traven Torsvan Croves, that he had been born in Chicago on May 3, 1890, to a Norwegian father Burton Torsvan and a mother Dorothy Croves of Anglo-Saxon descent and that he had also used the pseudonyms B. Traven and Hal Croves during his life. She read this information from her husband's will, which had been drawn up by him three weeks before his death (on March 4). Traven Torsvan Croves was also the name on the writer's official death certificate; his ashes, following cremation, were scattered from an airplane above the jungle of Chiapas state.

This seemed at first to be the definitive solution to the riddle of the writer's biography – B. Traven was, as he always claimed himself, an American, not the German Ret Marut. However, the 'solution' proved fleeting: some time after Croves' death, his widow gave another press announcement in which she claimed that her husband had authorized her to reveal the whole truth about his life, including facts that he had omitted from his will. The journalists heard that Croves had indeed been the German revolutionary named Ret Marut in his youth, which reconciled both the adherents of the theory of the Americanness and the proponents of the hypothesis about the Germanness of the writer. Rosa Elena Luján gave more information about these facts in her interview for the International Herald Tribune on April 8, 1969, where she claimed that her husband's parents had emigrated from the United States to Germany some time after their son's birth. In Germany, her husband published the successful novel The Death Ship, following which he went to Mexico for the first time, but returned to Germany to edit an anti-war magazine in the country "threatened by the emerging Nazi movement". He was sentenced to death, but managed to escape and went to Mexico again.

On the other hand, the hypothesis of B. Traven's Germanness seems to be confirmed by Hal Croves' extensive archive, to which his widow granted access to researchers sporadically until her death in 2009. Rolf Recknagel conducted research into it in 1976, and Karl Guthke in 1982. These materials include train tickets and banknotes from different East-Central European countries, possibly keepsakes Ret Marut retained after his escape from Germany following the failed revolution in Bavaria in 1919. A very interesting document is a small notebook with entries in the English language. The first entry is from July 11, 1924, and on July 26 the following significant sentence appeared in the notebook: "The Bavarian of Munich is dead". The writer might have started this diary on his arrival in Mexico from Europe, and the above note could have expressed his willingness to cut himself from his European past and start a new existence as B. Traven.

Moritz Rathenau theory 
On the 100th anniversary of the end of the Bavarian Soviet Republic Timothy Heyman, the husband of B. Traven's stepdaughter Malú Montes de Oca and co-manager of the B. Traven estate, published an article in the Mexican magazine Letras libres that reintroduced a hitherto neglected theory.  According to the theory, B. Traven was the illegitimate son of Emil Rathenau, founder of AEG and therefore the half-brother of the politician Walther Rathenau. Traven's real name was Moritz Rathenau.
This information was provided by Traven's translator Esperanza López Mateos, who had a close relationship with B. Traven and addressed him as "Mauricio". In 1947, four years before her death, she had revealed the story in writing to Mexican cinematographer Gabriel Figueroa, her brother-in-law. He remained silent until 1990. He then gave the name in an article in the French newspaper "Libération". Figueroa further stated that Traven's mother was an Irish actress, Helen Mareck, which might explain Traven's early mastery of English, as well as his closeness to the theater.

The Traven expert Karl S. Guthke analyzed the theory in the Schweizer Monat in 1991.  He came to the conclusion that the thesis was not provable at the time, but that there were reasons to believe it: "It adds credibility to the story (...) in principle that it begins with Esperanza and secondly that it is a definitely unromantic identification.". Traven is therefore not, as other theories suggest, son of a fisherman, a farmer or a theater impresario. Furthermore, Guthke goes on to suggest that "Ret Marut" may be a partial anagram of "Moritz Rathenau". Emil Rathenau's middle name was Moritz, and his grandfather's name was Moritz. The marriage of Emil Rathenaus was not very happy; he loved both the theater and women.
A third point Guthke mentions is that Ret Marut repeatedly indicated that he was not dependent on theater fees, and also the "Ziegelbrenner" could hardly have brought in very much. Other things may arguably make sense if one assumes that B. Traven was Moritz Rathenau. He was in many ways the opposite of his half-brother. Traven was a pacifist, the politician Walther Rathenau was responsible for German armaments in the First World War. Traven's solidarity with the proletariat would also be understandable, in opposition to his relationship with a great industrialist, which he, as an illegitimate son, was not supposed to have.

Proof could not be obtained from the Rathenau family, says Guthke (1990), because Walther Rathenau's estate was lost in 1939 and Emil Rathenau's estate was burned in 1943. However, Walther's estate reappeared again in an archive kept secret in Moscow until 1990 and can now, nearly 30 years after Guthke's essay, be consulted at the Walther Rathenau Society.

Other theories 

The above hypotheses, identifying B. Traven with Hal Croves, Traven Torsvan, Ret Marut and possibly Otto Feige, are not the only ones concerning the writer's identity that have appeared since the mid-1920s. Some of them are relatively well-founded, but others are quite fantastic and incredible. Some of the most common hypotheses, apart from those already mentioned, are presented below:

 B. Traven was two or more persons (Hal Croves/Traven Torsvan and Ret Marut) who worked in collaboration, according to John Huston.
 B. Traven was German; however, he did not come from Schwiebus but from northern Germany, the region between Hamburg and Lübeck. It is possible to conclude this on the basis of a preserved cassette, recorded by his stepdaughter Malú Montes de Oca (Rosa Luján's daughter), on which he sings two songs in Low German, a dialect of the German language, with some language features that are typical not only of this region. Torsvan is a relatively common name in this area, through which also the River Trave runs. In the neighbourhood there are also such places as Traventhal, Travenhorst and Travemünde (Lübeck's borough) – a large ferry harbour on the Baltic Sea.
 B. Traven was an illegitimate son of the German Emperor Wilhelm II. Such a hypothesis was presented by Gerd Heidemann, a reporter from Stern magazine, who claimed that he had obtained this information from Rosa Luján, Hal Croves' wife. Later, however, the journalist distanced himself from this hypothesis. In the event, Heidemann compromised his credibility with his complicity in the falsification of Hitler's diaries in the 1980s.
 B. Traven was the American writer Jack London, who faked his death and then moved to Mexico and continued writing his books.
 B. Traven was the pseudonym of the American writer Ambrose Bierce, who went to Mexico in 1913 to take part in the Mexican Revolution where he disappeared without a trace. Note that Bierce was born in 1842: this would have made him 83 at the time of Traven's first published work, and 127 at the time of his death in 1969.
 B. Traven was the pseudonym of Adolfo López Mateos, the President of Mexico (1958–1964). The source of this rumour was probably the fact that Esperanza López Mateos, Adolfo's sister, was Traven's representative in his contacts with publishers and a translator of his books into Spanish. Some have even claimed that the books published under the pen name B. Traven were actually written by Esperanza herself.
 The pseudonym B. Traven was used by August Bibelje, a former customs officer from Hamburg, gold prospector and adventurer. This hypothesis was also presented – and rejected – by the journalist Gerd Heidemann. According to Heidemann, Ret Marut met Bibelje after his arrival in Mexico and used his experiences in such novels as The Cotton Pickers, The Death Ship and The Treasure of the Sierra Madre. However, Bibelje himself returned to Europe later and died during the Spanish Civil War in 1937, whereas Traven wrote until 1960.

References 

Traven
Traven